Sunnyside Farm is a 1997 British comedy series.

Sunnyside Farm may also refer to:
Sunnyside (Woodbine, Maryland),  an historic slave plantation home in Howard County, Maryland
Sunnyside Farm (Hamilton, Virginia), an NRHP listing in Loudon County, Virginia
Sunnyside Farm (Leetown, West Virginia), near Kearneysville, listed on the NRHP in West Virginia
Sunnyside Farm Barn, Mandan, North Dakota, listed on the NRHP in North Dakota
Sunnyside Farm House, an NRHP listing in Jessamine County, Kentucky